Monotes is a genus of flowering plants in the family Dipterocarpaceae. Its name, meaning "unity" or "uniqueness" was chosen because it was the only genus of dipterocarp then known to occur in Africa. The Zambezian region is the centre of diversity for the genus.

The following species are accepted by The Plant List: 

Monotes adenophyllus Gilg
Monotes africana A.DC.
Monotes angolensis De Wild.
Monotes caloneurus Gilg
Monotes carrissoanus H.H.Bancr.
Monotes dasyanthus Gilg
Monotes dawei H.H.Bancr.
Monotes discolor R.E.Fr.
Monotes elegans Gilg
Monotes engleri Gilg
Monotes glandulosus Pierre
Monotes gossweileri De Wild.
Monotes hutchinsonianus Exell
Monotes hypoleucus (Welw.) Gilg
Monotes katangensis (De Wild.) De Wild.
Monotes kerstingii Gilg
Monotes loandensis Exell
Monotes lutambensis Verdc.
Monotes madagascariensis Humbert
Monotes magnificus Gilg
Monotes noldeae H.H.Bancr.
Monotes pearsonii H.H.Bancr.
Monotes redheadii P.A.Duvign.
Monotes rubriglans H.H.Bancr.
Monotes rufotomentosus Gilg
Monotes xasenguensis H.H.Bancr.

References

Dipterocarpaceae
Malvales genera
Taxonomy articles created by Polbot